Robert M. Moore (1816–1880) was an Irish-American mayor of Cincinnati.

Born in Cookstown, Ireland, Robert M. Moore immigrated about 1832 via Canada to the United States. Moore was a veteran of the Mexican–American War and as an officer joined the predominantly Irish American 10th Ohio Infantry in the Civil War. A Republican, Moore served as mayor of Cincinnati from 1877 to 1880.

References

External links 

Mayors of Cincinnati
Irish emigrants to the United States (before 1923)
1816 births
1880 deaths
Ohio Republicans
19th-century American politicians